Narakasuran is a 2006 Malayalam language film directed by K. R. Ramdas. It stars Sudhakar Vasanth, Riyaz Khan, Kalabhavan Mani, Jagathy Sreekumar, Indraja, Rajan P. Dev, Devan, Salim Kumar, Jagadish and Priyanka Anoop.

Cast
 Sudhakar Vasanth as Vijay/Prabhakaran alias Prabhu
Jagadeesh as Vasu
Indrans as Bheeman
 Kalabhavan Mani as Dr. Pramod - Vijay's Friend
Riyaz Khan as SP Rajan - Vijay's Friend
Madhupal as Adv. Bhaskar - Vijay's Friend and Legal Advisor
Devan as Badri
Mafia Sasi as Badri's henchman
Priyanka Anoop as Dr. Amritha Pramod - Dr. Pramod's Wife
Salim Kumar as CBI Officer Govind
Rajan P. Dev as CBI Officer Subhash Chandra
 Indraja as Neena Viswanath - Vijay's Fiancée
 Jagathy Sreekumar as Bhojarajan - Neena's Watchman/Cook
K. R. Vatsala as Vimala Bhojarajan - Neena's PA and Bhojarajan's wife

References

2006 films
2000s Malayalam-language films